Helsingborgs IF had its best season in a decade, being only two points off arch rivals and champions Malmö FF. With senior talisman Henrik Larsson retiring and Conny Karlsson being an unexpected coaching appointment to a midfield side, inspired signings such as Alexander Gerndt, Mattias Lindström, Erik Edman and Ardian Gashi lifted the team so far that they actually led the championship (albeit with Malmö having a game in hand) just a week before the end of the season. In the end, Malmö won the required matches, while Helsingborg choked and drew with Kalmar, a double-whammy that secured Malmö's title.

As consolation, Helsingborg was able to win Svenska Cupen, thanks to a late goal in a tense final against second flight-team Hammarby.

Squad

Goalkeepers
  Pär Hansson
  Oscar Berglund

Defenders
  Erik Edman
  Marcus Holgersson
  Abdul Khalili
  Christoffer Andersson
  Erik Wahlstedt
  Marcus Nilsson
  Fredrik Liverstam
  Robin Bok
  Joseph Baffo
  Joel Ekstrand

Midfielders
  Hannu Patronen
  May Mahlangu
  Ardian Gashi
  Mattias Lindström
  Erik Sundin
  Marcus Lantz
  René Makondele
  Johan Eiswold
  Christian Eliasson
  Lukas Ohlander

Attackers
  Rasmus Jönsson
  Alexander Gerndt
  Rachid Bouaouzan
  Mohammed Ramadan
  Rafael Porcellis

Allsvenskan

Matches

 Helsingborg-Brommapojkarna 1-0
 1-0 Mattias Lindström 
 Djurgården-Helsingborg 0-1
 0-1 Rasmus Jönsson 
 Helsingborg-IFK Göteborg 2-0
 1-0 Mattias Lindström 
 2-0 Marcus Nilsson 
 Trelleborg-Helsingborg 0-0
 Helsingborg-Elfsborg 2-1
 1-0 Ardian Gashi 
 1-1 Denni Avdić 
 2-1 Marcus Holgersson 
 Åtvidaberg-Helsingborg 0-3
 0-1 Christoffer Andersson 
 0-2 Christoffer Andersson 
 0-3 Erik Sundin 
 Helsingborg-Malmö FF 2-1
 0-1 Wílton Figueiredo 
 1-1 Ardian Gashi 
 2-1 Marcus Nilsson 
 Mjällby-Helsingborg 0-1
 0-1 Erik Sundin 
 Helsingborg-AIK 1-0
 1-0 Mattias Lindström 
 GAIS-Helsingborg 0-0
 Helsingborg-Örebro 2-1
 1-0 Christoffer Andersson 
 2-0 Rasmus Jönsson 
 2-1 Paulinho Guará 
 Gefle-Helsingborg 1-3
 1-0 Alexander Gerndt 
 1-1 May Mahlangu 
 1-2 Joel Ekstrand 
 1-3 Marcus Lantz 
 Kalmar FF-Helsingborg 1-0
 1-0 Daniel Mendes 
 Helsingborg-Halmstad 2-1
 1-0 Ardian Gashi 
 1-1 Tommy Jönsson 
 2-1 Ardian Gashi 
 Häcken-Helsingborg 2-1
 1-0 Mathias Ranégie 
 1-1 Christoffer Andersson 
 2-1 Paulinho 
 Helsingborg-Häcken 3-1
 0-1 Mattias Östberg 
 1-1 Erik Sundin 
 2-1 Erik Sundin 
 3-1 Marcus Holgersson 
 Brommapojkarna-Helsingborg 1-3
 1-0 Babis Stefanidis 
 1-1 Rasmus Jönsson 
 1-2 Christoffer Andersson 
 1-3 Ardian Gashi 
 Helsingborg-Djurgården 3-3
 0-1 Kennedy Igboananike 
 1-1 Alexander Gerndt 
 2-1 Alexander Gerndt 
 2-2 Mattias Jonson 
 2-3 Sharbel Touma 
 3-3 Alexander Gerndt 
 IFK Göteborg-Helsingborg 0-0
 Helsingborg-Trelleborg 1-0
 1-0 Alexander Gerndt 
 Örebro-Helsingborg 3-0
 1-0 Magnus Wikström 
 2-0 Magnus Kihlberg 
 3-0 Markus Astvald 
 Helsingborg-Gefle 3-1
 1-0 Alexander Gerndt 
 2-0 Alexander Gerndt 
 2-1 Yussif Chibsah 
 3-1 Alexander Gerndt 
 Malmö FF-Helsingborg 2-0
 1-0 Dardan Rexhepi 
 2-0 Wílton Figueiredo 
 Helsingborg-Mjällby 2-1
 1-0 Alexander Gerndt 
 2-0 Alexander Gerndt 
 2-1 Patrik Rosengren 
 AIK-Helsingborg 2-3
 1-0 Mohamed Bangura 
 1-1 Erik Sundin 
 1-2 Rasmus Jönsson 
 2-2 Marcus Nilsson 
 2-3 Christoffer Andersson 
 Helsingborg-GAIS 0-1
 0-1 Romarinho 
 Elfsborg-Helsingborg 1-3
 0-1 May Mahlangu 
 1-1 Mathias Florén 
 1-2 Erik Sundin 
 1-3 Erik Sundin 
 Helsingborg-Åtvidaberg 3-0
 1-0 Alexander Gerndt 
 2-0 Alexander Gerndt 
 3-0 Erik Sundin 
 Halmstad-Helsingborg 2-4
 0-1 Rasmus Jönsson 
 0-2 May Mahlangu 
 0-3 Alexander Gerndt 
 0-4 Rasmus Jönsson 
 1-4 Anselmo 
 2-4 Anselmo 
 Helsingborg-Kalmar FF 0-0

Topscorers
  Alexander Gerndt 12
  Erik Sundin 8
  Rasmus Jönsson 6
  Ardian Gashi 4
  Mattias Lindström 3

Helsingborg
2010